Lionel Beffre (born 20 January 1964) is a French senior civil servant. He was the High Commissioner in French Polynesia from 2013 to 2016, when he was appointed to his current role. He was preceded as High Commissioner by Jean-Pierre Laflaquière and succeeded by René Bidal. He is the former prefect of Pyrénées-Atlantiques.

Honours and decorations

National honours

Ministerial honours

Civilian medals

References

1964 births
High Commissioners of the Republic in French Polynesia
French civil servants
Living people
People from Aveyron
Prefects of Pyrénées-Atlantiques